Black Machine is an Italian electronic music group, most active throughout the 1990s. They are best known for the singles "How Gee", "Funky Funky People" and "Jazz Machine", all of which charted in several countries across Europe.

In 1992, "How Gee" peaked at No. 45 in France and No. 32 in the Netherlands, with "Funky Funky People" and "Jazz Machine (Remix)" also charting in the top 40 of the Dutch Single Top 100, both reaching No. 38. "Funky Funky People" was a top 20 hit in Austria, peaking at No. 18. "How Gee" was most successful in the United Kingdom, where it reached No. 17 in April 1994. It also reached No. 37 on the U.S. Billboard Hot Dance Club Play chart. The song was also featured in the 2021 film, House of Gucci.

Discography

Albums
The Album (1992)
Love 'N' Peace (1993)

Compilations
Double Mix (1991)
Double Mix (1993)

Singles
"How Gee" (1991) - UK #17, NETH #32, FRA #45, U.S. Dance #37
"Jazz Machine" (1992) - NETH #38
"Funky Funky People" (1992) - AUT #18, NETH #38
"Get Funky" (1993)
"Love 'N' Peace" (1993)
"U Make Me Come a Life" (1995)
"Jump Up" (1996)
"Thinkin' About You" (1997)
"Funky Banana" (1999)
"One, Two, Three, Four (How Gee)" (as Black Machine 2005) (2005)
"How Gee (25th Anniversary)" (2018)

References

External links

Italian electronic music groups
Italian musical trios
London Records artists
Carrere Records artists